In the Presence of Dinosaurs  is book that was published in 2000 by John Colagrande and Larry Felder.

Details

In the Presence of Dinosaurs focuses predominantly on the dinosaurs of North America over the course of five different time periods and details the flora, fauna, geology and geography of each time period in a manner akin to a naturalist's viewpoint. The book is divided into seven chapters, each supplemented with illustrations regarding the prominent animals and plants in each time and area.

Chapter 1: New World Order
The first chapter focuses on the rise of life in North America after the Permian Extinction during the Triassic. The rise of archosaurs as one of the predominant groups is highlighted, along with their competitors, the therapsids. Pterosaurs are shown beginning to take flight.

Animals mentioned: 
Sharovipteryx (illustrated) 
Preondactylus (illustrated)
Garjainia (illustrated) 
Eoraptor (illustrated)
Cynognathus (illustrated) 
Megazostrodon (illustrated)

Chapter 2: Veiled Woodlands
This second chapter focuses on the areas that will become the Petrified Forest during the Triassic. Here, Phytosaurs such as Rutiodon and Rauisuchians such as Postosuchus dominate as the region's top predators and Aetosaurs and Dicynodonts play the role of the local large herbivores. Dinosaurs such as Coelophysis and Fabrosaurs also dwell here but are considered uncommon animals in the ecosystem.

Animals mentioned:  
Rutiodon 
Chinlea (referred to as Chinlia)
Placerias 
Calyptosuchus 
Desmatosuchus 
Postosuchus 
Hesperosuchus 
Icarosaurus 
Fabrosaurids (real genus not disclosed) 
Metoposaurus 
Eudimorphodon 
Coelophysis

Chapter 3: Rift Valley
The third chapter focuses on the Early Jurassic rift valleys and lake ecosystems. By this time, the dinosaurs now completely dominate the landscape, and their adaptations that allow them to survive this unpredictable, drought and forest fire-prone environment are discussed.

Animals mentioned: 
Coelophysis (species unknown) 
Semionotus 
Ammosaurus  
Anchisaurus 
Dilophosaurus 
Diplurus 
Fabrosaurids 
Trithelodonts (illustrated only)

Chapter 4: Plains Dominion
Chapter 4 takes place during the Late Jurassic (Tithonian stage), and focuses on the iconic fauna of the time period, such as Apatosaurus, Allosaurus, and Stegosaurus among others. Also discussed is how the changing of the wet and dry seasons effect the wildlife and how sauropods influence the landscape.

Animals mentioned: 
Comodactylus 
Mesadactylus 
Apatosaurus 
Brachiosaurus 
Camarasaurus 
Stegosaurus 
Camptosaurus
Othnielia 
Ceratosaurus  
Allosaurus 
Ornitholestes
Coelurus 
Dryolestida (referred to as pantotheres)

Chapter 5: Wandering Shores
The fifth chapter deals with the Niobrara Sea during the Campanian Stage of the Late Cretaceous. The speculative habits of animals such as Hesperornis and Pteranodon are examined, and the influence of the sea is discussed.

Animals mentioned: 
Hydrotherosaurus (illustrated only) 
Elasmosaurus  
Cretoxyrhina (illustrated only)
Hesperornis 
Pteranodon 
Apsopelix 
Nyctosaurus 
Ichthyornis 
Archelon 
Tylosaurus 
Ammonites

Chapter 6: Corridor
Corridor discusses the biodiversity of the dinosaurs of the Campanian stage of Laramidia, the possible migrations they might have made to feed and reproduce, and how those migrations effect both local wildlife and the environment.

Animals mentioned: 
Parasaurolophus 
Corythosaurus 
Chasmosaurinae 
Centrosaurinae 
Hadrosaurus 
Tyrannosauridae (species not mentioned) 
Troodon 
Dromaeosaurus  
Ornithomimidae 
Hypsilophodontidae

Chapter 7: Glens of Hell Creek
In this last chapter, the impact of Tyrannosaurus on its environment and fellow animals is discussed and how it in turn is affected by its prey.

Animals mentioned: 
Tyrannosaurus 
Edmontosaurus 
Triceratops 
Ankylosaurus 
Ornithomimidae 
Dromaeosauridae
Troodontidae

2000 non-fiction books
Dinosaur books
Paleontology books